1201 North Market Street is a , 23-story high rise building in Wilmington, Delaware. It is the tallest building in Wilmington and the state of Delaware. The tower was designed by the architectural firm of Skidmore, Owings & Merrill and opened in 1988.  On clear days, the skyline of Philadelphia, 30 miles to the northeast, can be seen from the top floors.

See also
List of tallest buildings in Wilmington, Delaware
List of tallest buildings by U.S. state

References

External links
McConnell Johnson website
1201 N. Market St. Building website

Skyscrapers in Wilmington, Delaware
Skyscraper office buildings in Delaware
JPMorgan Chase buildings
Skidmore, Owings & Merrill buildings
Office buildings completed in 1988
1988 establishments in Delaware